The list of aerial lifts in Japan lists aerial lifts in the nation.

All of them are legally considered as a sort of railway. Chairlift is officially called , while colloquially called . Other aerial lifts are officially called , or colloquially . Number of Japanese "normal ropeways" listed here are as follows.

It is also notable that the word  does not refer to aerial lifts in Japan, but to cable railways, such as cable cars proper or funiculars. (However, Japan currently does not have any cable cars proper, but funiculars.)

This article only lists "normal ropeways"; in other words, aerial lifts excluding chairlifts. Names might be tentative.

Italicized name: Aerial lifts that operate seasonal, mostly in ski resorts.
T: Aerial tramways. (Those without T are gondola lifts.)
F: Funitels.

Hokkaidō
Alpha Cabin, Alpha Resort Tomamu; Hoshino Resort Tomamu
Annupuri Gondola, Niseko Annupuri Ski Resort; Chūō Bus Kankō Shōji
Asahidake Ropeway T, Asahidake Ropeway Ski Resort; Wakasa Resort
Daisetsuzan Sōunkyō Kurodake Ski Resort; Rinyū Kankō
Daisetsuzan Sōunkyō Kurodake Ropeway T
Kurodake Pair Gondola
Furano Ski Resort; Prince Hotels
Furano Ropeway T
Kitanomine Gondola
Kamui Ski Links Gondola, Kamui Ski Links; Asahikawa Kita Inter Development
Kiroro Gondola, Kiroro Resort; Kiroro Associates
Lake Cabin, Windsor Snow Village; The Windsor Hotels International
Mt. Hakodate Ropeway T

Mt. Moiwa Ropeway T, Sapporo Moiwayama Ski Resort; Sapporo Development
Nanae Gondola, Hakodate Nanae Ski Resort; Winter Garden
Niseko Mt. Resort Grand Hirafu; Niseko Mountain Resort
Ace #2 Center Four
Hirafu Gondola
Noboribetsu Onsen Ropeway; Noboribetsu Onsen Cable
Otaru Tenguyama Ropeway T, Otaru Tenguyama Ski Resort; Chūō Bus Kankō Shōji
Prince Gondola, Niseko Higashiyama Ski Resort; Niseko Higashiyama Resort
Rusutsu Resort; Kamori Kankō
East Gondola Line 1
East Gondola Line 2
Izora Gondola
West Gondola
Sahoro Gondola, Sahoro Resort; Kamori Kankō
Sapporo International Ski Resort; Sapporo Resort Development
Skycabin 6
Skycabin 8
Sapporo Teine; Kamori Kankō
Teine Eight Gondola
Teineyama Ropeway T
Shuttle 6 Gondola, Mount Racey; Yūbari Resort
Usuzan Ropeway T; Wakasa Resort

Tōhoku region

Aomori Prefecture
Ajigasawa Ski Resort; Winter Garden Resorts
Hakkōda Ropeway T
Ōwani Ajara Park Gondola, Ōwani Regional General Development
Tsugaru Iwaki Skyline

Iwate Prefecture
Appi Kogen Ski Resort; Iwate Hotel and Resort
Appi Gondola
Sailer Gondola
Geto Kōgen Ski Resort; Geto Kōgen Development
First Gondola
Second Gondola
Iwate Kōgen Snow Park; Hotel & Resort Management
Shizukuishi Ski Resort; Prince Hotels
Second Gondola
Senshōgahara
Ropeway T

Akita Prefecture
Ani Gondola: Winter Garden Resorts

Miyagi Prefecture
Eboshi Kōgen Gondola; Miyagi Zaō Kankō
Resort Park Onikōbe; Onikōbe Resort System

Yamagata Prefecture
Gondola, Miyagi Zaō Eboshi Ski Resort; Miyagi Zaō Kankō
Tengendai Ropeway T; Nishiazuma Ropeway
Zaō Chūō Ropeway T
Zaō Ropeway, Yamagata Zaō Onsen Ski Resort
Sanchō Line F
Sanroku Line T
Zaō Skycable, Yamagata Zaō Onsen Ski Resort; Yamakō

Fukushima Prefecture
Adatara Express, Adatara Kōgen Ski Resort; Fujikyū Adatara Kankō
Altz Gondola, Altz Bandai; Bandai Resort Development
Gondola, Urabandai Gran Deco Ski Resort; Tōkyū Resort Service
Tenkyōdai Gondola (Skyshuttle), Inawashiro Resort; Cest la vie Resort

Kantō region

Gunma Prefecture
Gondola Pal Cabin, Palcall Tsumakoi Ski Resort; Palcall Tsumakoi
Gondola Super Way, White World Oze Iwakura; Oze Development
Harunasan Ropeway; Tanigawadake Ropeway
Ikaho Ropeway T 伊香保ロープウェイ; Shibukawa City Government
Nikkō Shiranesan Ropeway, Malnuma Kōgen Ski Resort; Nippon Paper Development
Shirane Kazan Ropeway, Kusatsu International Ski Resort; Kusatsu Town Government
Tanigawadake Ropeway F, Mount Tanigawa Tenjindaira Ski Resort

Tochigi Prefecture
Akechidaira Ropeway T; Nikkō-kōtsū
Gondola Lift, Hunter Mt. Shiobara
Kinugawa Onsen Ropeway T 鬼怒川温泉ロープウェイ; Kinugawa Kōgen Kaihatsu
Nasu Ropeway T 那須ロープウェイ; Tōya Kōtsū
Jeans Gondola, Mt. Jeans Ski Resort; Hunter Mt. Shiobara

Ibaraki Prefecture
Mt. Tsukuba Ropeway T; Ibaraki Kankō Railway

Chiba Prefecture
Nokogiriyama Ropeway T

Saitama Prefecture
Hodosan Ropeway T; Hodo Kōgyō

Kanagawa Prefecture
Hakone Komagatake Ropeway T; Izuhakone Railway
Hakone Ropeway F
Skyshuttle; Yomiuriland
Yokohama Air Cabin; Senyo Kogyo
Yume no Gondola T, Seiyūkaku Yamatoya Hotel

Chūbu region

Shizuoka Prefecture
Atami Ropeway T
Awashima Kaijō Ropeway T; Awashima Marinepark
Kanzanji Ropeway T; Entetsu Tourism Development
Katsuragiyama Ropeway (Skyride), Izu Nagaoka Panorama Park; Dainichi
Nihondaira Ropeway T; Shizuoka Railway
Shimoda Ropeway T

Yamanashi Prefecture
Lake Kawaguchi Mt. Tenjō Ropeway (Tenjō-Yama Park Mt. Kachi Kachi Ropeway) T; Fuji Kyūkō
Minobusan Ropeway T; Minobu Tozan Railway
Shōsenkyō Ropeway T; Shōsenkyō Kankō

Nagano Prefecture
Fifth Gondola (Skysneakers), Tangram Ski Circus; Tangram Madarao
Fujimidai Kōgen Ropeway; Heavens Sonohara
Gondola, Okushiga-Kōgen Ski Resort; Nagano Electric Railway
Gondola Adam, Hakuba Happō-One Ski Resort; Hakuba Kankō Kaihatsu
Gondola Noah, Hakuba Iwatake Ski Resort; Hakuba Kakō Kaihatsu
Gondola Ryūsei, Fujimi Panorama Resort; Fujimi Town Development
Goryū Tōmi Tele Cabin, Hakuba Goryū Ski Resort; Enrei
Nozawa Onsen Ski Resort; Nozawa Onsen
Hikage Gondola
Nagasaka Gondola
Ontake Gondola Sanhō Line (Skylove), Ontake Ski Resort; Ontake Management
Hakuba47 Winter Sports Park; Hakuba47
First Gondola
Forth Gondola
Hasuike Ropeway T, Shigakōgen Ski Resort; Shigakōgen Ropeway
Higashitateyama Gondola Lift, Shiga Kōgen Higashitateyama Ski Resort; Shigayama Lift
Komagatake Ropeway T, Chūō Alpes Senjōjiki Ski Resort; Chūō Alpes Kankō
Ontake Ropeway, Ontake Ropeway Ski Resort
Pilatus Tateshina Ropeway T, Pilatus Tateshina Ski Resort
Ryuoo Ropeway T, Ryuoo Ski Park; Ryuoo Kanko
Shiga Kōgen Yakebitaiyama Ski Resort; Prince Hotels
Yakebitaiyama First Gondola
Yakebitaiyama Second Gondola
Tateshina Bokujō Gondola (Shuttle Venus). Shirakaba Kōgen International Ski Resort; Tateshina Town Government
Tsugaike Kōgen Ski Resort; Tsugaike Gondola Lift
Tsugaike Gondola (Gondola Eve)
Tsugaike Ropeway T

Niigata Prefecture
Arai Gondola Lift; Arai Resort
Gala Yuzawa Ski Resort; Gala Yuzawa
Gondola Diligence
Ropeway LanDau T (Temporary closed)
Gondola, Cupid Valley Ski Resort; Cupid Valley
Hakkaisan Ropeway T, Muikamachi Hakkaisan Ski Resort; Prince Hotels
Iwappara Gondola, Iwa-ppara Winter Resort; Iwappara Kankō (Temporary closed)
Maiko Gondola , Maiko Kōrakuen Ski Resort; Tokyo Dome Resort Operations
Mt. Naeba Ski Resort; Prince Hotels
Kagura Gondola
Mitsumata Ropeway T
Naeba-Tashiro Gondola (Dragondola)
Prince First Gondola
Prince Second Gondola
Tashiro Ropeway T
Myōkōkōgen Sky Cable gondola, Akakura Kankō Ski Resort
Myōkō Suginohara Gondola, Myōkō Suginohara Ski Resort; Prince Hotels
Yahikoyama Ropeway T; Yahikoyama Kankō Ropeway
Yuzawa Kōgen Ropeway (Yuzawa Onsen Ropeway) T, Yuzawa Kōgen Ski Resort; Snow Resort Service

Ishikawa Prefecture
Gondola, Sky Shishiku Ski Resort; Atom Unyu
Gondola Lift, Hakusan Sena Kōgen Ski Resort; Hakusan Lake Highland
Rino, Hakusan Ichirino Onsen Ski Resort; Hakusanshi Chiikishinkōkōsha

Toyama Prefecture
Gondola Lift, Iox-Arosa; Iō Arosa
Tateyama Ropeway T; Tateyama Kurobe Kankō
Tateyama Sanroku Gondola Lift, Raichō Valley Ski Resort; Ōyama Kankō Kaihatsu

Gifu Prefecture
Gondola Flying Ciao, Ciao Ontake Ski Resort; Hida Forest City Planning
Mt. Kinka Ropeway T; Gifu Kankō Ropeway
Shinhotaka Ropeway; Okuhi Sightseeing Development
No. 1 Ropeway T
No. 2 Ropeway T
SP Gondola, Takasu Snow Park; J Mountains Group
Wing Gondola, Wing Hills Shirotori Resort; Royal Hills

Mie Prefecture
Gozaisho Ropeway, Gozaisho Ski Resort

Kansai region

Shiga Prefecture
Alpes Gondola, Biwako Valley Ski Resort; Biwako Valley
Hachimanyama Ropeway T; Ohmi Railway
Hakodateyama Ropeway T, Hakodateyama Ski Resort; Ohmi Railway
Ibukiyama Ropeway, Piste Japon Ibuki Ski Resort; Piste Japon

Nara Prefecture
Katsuragisan Ropeway T; Kintetsu Railway
Yoshino Ropeway T; Yoshino Ōmine Kēburu Bus

Kyōto Prefecture
Eizan Ropeway T; Keifuku Electric Railway

Ōsaka Prefecture
Mt. Kongō Ropeway T; Chihayaakasaka Village Government

Hyōgo Prefecture
Kami Town Ojiro Gondola Lift, Ojiro Ski Resort; Ojiro Tourist Association
Kinosaki Onsen Ropeway T; Kinosaki Kankō
Maya Ropeway (Maya View Line Yume-Sanpo) T; Kōbe City Urban Development
Mt. Shosha Ropeway T; Himeji City Government
Rokkō Arima Ropeway T; Kōbe City Urban Development
Shin-Kōbe Ropeway (Kōbe Yume-Fūsen); Kōbe City Urban Development
Sky Safari, Himeji Central Park; Kamori Kankō
Sumaura Ropeway T; Sanyō Electric Railway

Chūgoku region

Hiroshima Prefecture
Miyajima Ropeway; Hiroshima Tourism Promoting
Sanchō Line T
Sanroku Line
Senkōji Ropeway T; Onomichi City Government

Yamaguchi Prefecture
Iwakunijō Ropeway T; Iwakuni City Government
Ōhirayama Ropeway T; Hōfu City Government

Shimane Prefecture
Asahi Tengusuton Ski Resort; Airana
Gondola, Mizuho Highland; Shinrin Keikaku

Shikoku region

Kagawa Prefecture
Kankakei Ropeway T; Shōdoshima Sōgō Kaihatsu
Unpenji Ropeway T; Shikoku Cable

Tokushima Prefecture
Bizan Ropeway T; Tokushima City Tourist Association
Hashikurasan Ropeway TF
Tairyūji Ropeway T; Shikoku Cable

Ehime Prefecture
Ishizuchi Tozan Ropeway T, Ishizuchi Ski & Snowboard Resort
Matsuyamajō Ropeway T; Matsuyama City Government
Okudōgo Ropeway T; Okudōgo Kokusai Kankō

Kyūshū region

Ōita Prefecture
Beppu Ropeway T; Beppu Ropeway

Nagasaki Prefecture
Nagasaki Ropeway and Aquarium
Nagasaki Ropeway T
Nagasaki Skyway
Unzen Ropeway T

Kumamoto Prefecture
Mt. Aso Ropeway T; Kyūshū Sankō Tourism
Sensuikyō Ropeway T; Higashi Aso Kankō Kaihatsu

See also
List of aerial tramways
List of gondola lifts
List of railway companies in Japan
List of railway lines in Japan
List of railway stations in Japan
List of railway electrification systems in Japan
Rail transport in Japan
Monorails in Japan
List of airport people mover systems
List of bus operating companies in Japan
List of defunct railway companies in Japan

External links

 Cableman, Information on Japanese aerial lifts.

 list
 list
Aerial tramways